Artem Isaev (born 18 April 1996) is a Russian Paralympic swimmer who represented Russian Paralympic Committee athletes at the 2020 Summer Paralympics.

Career
Isaev represented Russian Paralympic Committee athletes at the 2020 Summer Paralympics in the men's 100 metre breaststroke SB9 and won a silver medal.

References

1996 births
Living people
Medalists at the World Para Swimming European Championships
People from Nizhnekamsk
Paralympic swimmers of Russia
Swimmers at the 2020 Summer Paralympics
Medalists at the 2020 Summer Paralympics
Paralympic medalists in swimming
Paralympic silver medalists for the Russian Paralympic Committee athletes
Russian male breaststroke swimmers
S10-classified Paralympic swimmers
Sportspeople from Tatarstan